Melis Sekmen (born 26 September 1993) is a German politician of the Alliance 90/The Greens who has been a member of the Bundestag since the 2021 German federal election. She is of Turkish descent.

Political career
In parliament, Sekmen serves on the Committee on Economic Affairs. In addition to her committee assignments, she has been a member of the German delegation to the Franco-German Parliamentary Assembly since 2022.

References

External links 
 

Living people
1993 births
Politicians from Mannheim
21st-century German politicians
21st-century German women politicians
Members of the Bundestag for Alliance 90/The Greens
Members of the Bundestag 2021–2025
Female members of the Bundestag
German politicians of Turkish descent